Somalia is classified by the United Nations as a least developed country, with the majority of its population being dependent on agriculture and livestock for their livelihood. The economy of Somalia is $4.918 billion by gross domestic product as of 2020. For 1994, the CIA estimated it at purchasing power parity to be approximately $3.3 billion. In 2001, it was estimated to be $4.1 billion. By 2009, the CIA estimated that it had grown to $5.731 billion, with a projected real growth rate of 2.6%. In 2014, the International Monetary Fund estimated economic activity to have expanded by 3.7% primarily. This expansion was driven by growth in the primary sector and the secondary sector. According to a 2007 British Chambers of Commerce report, the private sector has experienced growth, particularly in the service sector. Unlike the pre-civil war period, when most services and the industrial sector were government-run, there has been substantial, albeit unmeasured, private investment in commercial activities. The investment has been largely financed by the Somali diaspora, and includes trade and marketing, money transfer services, transportation, communications, fishery equipment, airlines, telecommunications, education, health, construction and hotels.

According to the United Nations Development Programme (UNDP) Somalia,  the country had some of the lowest development indicators in the world, and a "strikingly low" Human Development Index (HDI) value of 0.285. This would rank amongst the lowest in the world if comparable data were available, and when adjusted for the significant inequality that exists in Somalia, its HDI is even lower. The UNDP notes that "inequalities across different social groups, a major driver of conflict, have been widening".

Somalia's economy consists of both traditional and modern production, with a gradual shift to more modern industrial techniques. According to the Central Bank of Somalia, about 80% of the population are nomadic or semi-nomadic pastoralists, who keep goats, sheep, camels and cattle. The nomads also gather resins and gums to supplement their income.

According to the World Bank, Somalia's economy has suffered as a result of the state failure that accompanied the country's civil war. Some economists, including libertarian Peter T. Leeson, have argued instead that state collapse has actually helped improve economic welfare, because the previous Somali state was predatory.

Economic indicators
According to the African Development Bank, Somalia is "characterized by a severe lack of basic economic and social statistics". This situation has been exacerbated by the civil war and institutional collapse, although even prior to Somalia's state failure, data was often unreliable.

The World Bank reports that Somalia's GDP was $917.0 million in 1990 and its total population was 13.42 million in 2014, and has since risen to 15 million as of 2018, marking roughly a 12% increase in its total population since then. In 2018 the World bank estimated an annual GDP of $6.2 billion, similar in size to Guam and the Kyrgyz Republic, and classifies it as a low-income country. The United Nations Statistics Division reports a GDP figure of $1.306 billion for 2012, compared to $2.316 billion in 2005 and $1.071 billion in 2010.

According to the Central Bank of Somalia, sometime in the 2000s the country's GDP per capita according to the World Bank was $230, a slight reduction in real terms from 1990. The 2012 Human Development Report estimates per capita GDP to be $284, compared with an average across sub-Saharan Africa of $1,300 per capita. This GDP per capita figure is the fourth lowest in the world. About 43% of the population live on less than 1 US dollar a day, with about 24% of those found in urban areas and 54% living in rural areas.

According to the United Nations Development Programme (UNDP) Somalia,  the country had some of the lowest development indicators in the world, and a "strikingly low" Human Development Index (HDI) value of 0.285. This would rank amongst the lowest in the world if comparable data were available, and when adjusted for the significant inequality that exists in Somalia, its HDI is even lower. The UNDP notes that "inequalities across different social groups, a major driver of conflict, have been widening". The UN has classified Somalia as a least developed country since its Committee for Development Policy began categorising states in this way in 1971.

An International Monetary Fund mission to Somalia reports estimated GDP growth of 3.7% in 2014 and CPI inflation of -71.10%. The report notes that provided that Somalia's security situation continues to improve modestly and there is no drought, economic growth in the medium term should average 5%, but that "growth will remain inadequate to redress poverty and gender disparities". An estimated 73% of the people of Somalia live below the poverty line in 2016.

State failure and economic welfare
According to the World Bank, within two years of the outbreak of civil war in 1988, Somali state institutions collapsed and "most of the economic and social infrastructure and assets were destroyed". In 2003 the Bank said that despite the absence of a state and its institutions, the Somali private sector experienced impressive growth, but that "most of these sectors are now becoming either stagnant or their growth is hindered due to the lack of investment, trained manpower and the absence of a relevant legal and regulatory framework to enforce rules and regulations, common standards and quality control". The report notes difficulties encouraging and making use of domestic savings for investment, due to the lack of formal financial services and regulatory agencies. The lack of state institutions, the Bank argues, resulted in the prevention of access to international capital markets.

In an article published in 2007, libertarian economist Peter T. Leeson argues that the Somali state was predatory, and that its collapse has improved the economic welfare of its citizens, with 14 out of 18 key development indicators being more positive in the period 2000-2005 than in 1985–1990. Similarly, economists Benjamin Powell, Ryan Ford and Alex Nowrasteh argue that Somalia's economic performance, relative to other African states, has improved during the period of statelessness. Ersun Kurtulus states that Leeson and Powell, Ford and Nowrasteh's articles provide "the most unequivocal evidence to indicate that Somalia has been faring far better under anarchy than it did under Barre's regime". Kurtulus argues that these authors may provide a valid explanation of the situation in Somalia, but that "the argument appears to be derived from a hypothesis which is rooted in a liberal conceptualisation of statehood rather than in a quantitative analysis which establishes a negative correlation between indicators of state predation and those of economic and social welfare". Kurtulus suggests that the collapse of a repressive state may improve personal and civil liberties, but that such an account "overemphasises endogenous factors that are vested in the domestic arena, while neglecting the exogenous factors that operate at the regional and international level".

Agriculture

Agriculture is the most important economic sector. It accounts for about 65% of the GDP and employs 65% of the workforce. Livestock contributes about 40% to GDP and more than 50% of export earnings. Other principal exports include fish, charcoal and bananas; sugar, sorghum and corn are products for the domestic market. According to the Central Bank of Somalia, imports of goods total about $460 million per year, and have recovered and even surpassed aggregate imports prior to the start of the civil war in 1991. Exports, which total about $270 million annually, have also surpassed pre-war aggregate export levels but still lead to a trade account deficit of about $190 million US dollars per year. However, this trade deficit is far exceeded by remittances sent by Somalis in the diaspora, which have helped sustain the import level.

With the advantage of being located near the Arabian Peninsula, Somali traders have increasingly begun to challenge Australia's traditional dominance over the Persian Gulf Arab livestock and meat market, offering quality animals at very low prices. In response, Persian Gulf Arab states have started to make strategic investments in the region, with Saudi Arabia building livestock export infrastructure and the United Arab Emirates purchasing large farmlands. Additionally, fishing fleets from Europe and Asia have reached commercial fishing agreements in the northern Puntland region.

With Somalia exporting 3 million sheep in 2012, its live exports to the Middle East have overtaken Australian exports which numbered 2 million. According to the Australian Bureau of Agricultural and Resource Economics and Sciences, 99% of the country's livestock exports are headed to the Middle East. However, since 2006, there has been a 10% decline "because of increasing competition in export markets from African and eastern European sheep exports". More than 5 million livestock were exported in 2014, the highest amount in 20 years. Neighbouring Somaliland is also home to some of the largest livestock markets, known in Somali as seylad, in the Horn of Africa, with as many as 10,000 heads of sheep and goats sold daily in the markets of Burao and Yirowe, many of whom shipped to Gulf states via the port of Berbera. The markets handle livestock from all over the Horn of Africa.

Frankincense and myrrh are important export products for Somalia. Along with Ethiopia and Kenya, Somalia is one of the world's three largest suppliers of these products.

Manufacturing

The modest industrial sector, based on the processing of agricultural products, accounts for 10% of Somalia's GDP.

Prior to the outbreak of the civil war in 1991, the roughly 53 state-owned small, medium and large manufacturing firms were foundering, with the ensuing conflict destroying many of the remaining industries. However, primarily as a result of substantial local investment by the Somali diaspora, many of these small-scale plants have re-opened and newer ones have been created. The latter include fish-canning and meat-processing plants in the north, as well as about 25 factories in the Mogadishu area, which manufacture pasta, mineral water, confections, plastic bags, fabric, hides and skins, detergent and soap, aluminum, foam mattresses and pillows, fishing boats, carry out packaging, and stone processing.

In 2001, investments in light manufacturing have expanded in Bosaso, Hargeisa and Mogadishu, in particular, indicating growing business confidence in the economy. To this end, in 2004, an $8.3 million Coca-Cola bottling plant opened in Mogadishu, with investors hailing from various constituencies in Somalia. Various other sectors have also attracted foreign investment from the likes of General Motors and Dole Fruit.

Airline industry

Following the start of the civil war, all of Somali Airlines' operations were officially suspended in 1991. By 2014, there were over six Somali-owned private carriers filling the gap. These included Daallo Airlines, Jubba Airways, African Express Airways, East Africa 540, Central Air and Hajara. Daallo and Jubba merged as the African Airways Alliance in 2015.

Despite reports of preparations to relaunch Somali Airlines in 2012 and 2013, Al Arabiya reports discussing the merger of Daallo Airlines and Jubba Airways in February 2015 said there was no official Somali flag carrier after the demise of Somali Airlines in 1991.

Construction

As a result of improved security conditions in Mogadishu, the Economist Intelligence Unit reported in 2015 that construction of new infrastructure and repairs to previously abandoned villas was occurring in the city. However, the Central Intelligence Agency's The World Factbook states that development has not spread to other parts of Somalia, and that security is a major concern for businesses in Mogadishu.

Telecommunications and media

Somalia's telecommunications system was destroyed during the fighting which took place in 1991. By 2010 various new telecommunications companies were providing this missing infrastructure. Funded by Somali entrepreneurs and backed by expertise from People's Republic of China, Japan, EU and  Korea. These nascent telecommunications firms offer affordable mobile phone and internet services that are not available in many other parts of the continent. Customers can conduct money transfers and other banking activities via mobile phones, as well as easily gain wireless internet access. However, the operations of the companies were constrained by the continuing fighting.

In 2004, installation time for a landline was three days, while in Kenya to the south, waiting lists were many years long. Interviewed in 2004, telecommunications firms were "desperate" to have an effective government: "everything starts with security." There are presently around 25 mainlines per 1,000 persons, and the local availability of telephone lines (tele-density) is higher than in neighboring countries; three times greater than in adjacent Ethiopia. Prominent Somali telecommunications companies include Golis Telecom Group, Hormuud Telecom, Somafone, Nationlink, Netco, Telcom and Somali Telecom Group. Hormuud Telecom alone grosses about $40 million a year. To dampen competitive pressures, three of these companies signed an interconnectivity deal in 2005 that allows them to set prices and expand their networks.

A 2010 report stated that the expansion of Somalia's telecom industry provided one of the clearest signs that the country's economy was growing.

As of 2015, there were also 20 privately owned Somali newspapers, 10 radio and television stations, and numerous internet sites offering information to the public.

Finance

The Central Bank of Somalia is the official monetary authority of Somalia. In terms of financial management, it is in the process of assuming the task of both formulating and implementing monetary policy. In 2013 the African Development Bank assessed that the Somali Central Bank was "handicapped by the lack of adequate human, material and financial resources", but that it would be able to reduce the rate of inflation once it assumed control of monetary policy and issued a new currency. At this time Somaliland also had a central bank, though its main roles were to serve as a treasury to the government and print currency.

Owing to a lack of confidence in the local currency, the US dollar is widely accepted as a medium of exchange alongside the Somali shilling. Dollarization notwithstanding, the large issuance of the Somali shilling has caused inflation. The central bank says it will end the inflationary environment when it assumes full control of monetary policy and replaces the presently circulating currency introduced by the private sector.

Somalia has had no central monetary authority for upwards of 15 years between the outbreak of the civil war in 1991 and the subsequent re-establishment of the Central Bank of Somalia in 2009. Bank-to-bank transfers are not possible, which led to the rise of private money transfer operators (MTO) that have acted as informal banking networks.

These remittance firms (hawalas) have become a large industry in Somalia, with an estimated US$1.6 billion annually remitted to the region by Somalis in the diaspora via money transfer companies. The latter include Dahabshiil, Qaran Express, Mustaqbal, Amal Express, Kaah Express, Hodan Global, Olympic, Amana Express, Iftin Express and Tawakal Express. Most are credentialed members of the Somali Money Transfer Association (SOMTA), an umbrella organization that regulates the community's money transfer sector, or its predecessor, the Somali Financial Services Association (SFSA). Somalia is the world's fourth-most country dependent on remittances. Most remittances are sent by Somalis-based abroad to relatives in Somalia. This accounts for 20%-50% of the Somali economy.

Dahabshiil is the largest of the Somali money transfer operators (MTO), having captured most of the market vacated by Al-Barakaat. The firm has its headquarters in London and employs more than 2000 people across 144 countries, with 130 branches in the United Kingdom alone, a further 130 branches in Somalia, and 400 branches globally, including one in Dubai. The company provides a broad range of financial services to international organisations, as well as to both large and small businesses and private individuals. After Dahabshiil, Qaran Express is the largest Somali-owned funds transfer company. The firm has its headquarters in both London and Dubai, with 175 agents worldwide, 66 agents in Somalia and 64 in London, and charges nothing for remitting charity funds. Mustaqbal is the third most prominent Somali MTO, with 8 agents in Somalia and 49 in the UK. As with Dahabshiil and Qaran Express, it also has a notable presence internationally.

As the reconstituted Central Bank of Somalia fully assumes its monetary policy responsibilities, some of the existing money transfer companies are expected in the near future to seek licenses so as to develop into full-fledged commercial banks. This will serve to expand the national payments system to include formal cheques, which in turn is expected to reinforce the efficacy of the use of monetary policy in domestic macroeconomic management.

With a significant improvement in local security, Somali expatriates began returning to the country for investment opportunities. Coupled with modest foreign investment, the inflow of funds have helped the Somali shilling increase considerably in value. By March 2014, the currency had appreciated by almost 60% against the U.S. dollar over the previous 12 months. The Somali shilling was the strongest among the 175 global currencies traded by Bloomberg, rising close to 50 percentage points higher than the next most robust global currency over the same period.

Stock exchange
The Somalia Stock Exchange (SSE) is the national bourse of Somalia. It was founded in 2012 by the Somali diplomat Idd Mohamed, Ambassador extraordinary and deputy permanent representative to the United Nations. The SSE was established to attract investment from both Somali-owned firms and global companies in order to accelerate the ongoing post-conflict reconstruction process in Somalia.

In August 2012, the SSE signed a Memorandum of understanding with the Nairobi Securities Exchange (NSE) to assist it in technical development. The agreement includes identifying appropriate expertise and support. Sharia compliant sukuk bonds and halal equities are also envisioned as part of the deal as Somalia's nascent stock market develops.

As of November 2014, the Somalia Stock Exchange has established administrative offices in Mogadishu, Kismayo, and other urban centers in Somalia. The bourse is slated to officially open in 2015. Initially, seven Somali-owned firms from the financial services, telecommunications and transportation sectors are expected to list their shares therein for prospective global investment.

Natural Resources

Somalia has untapped reserves of numerous natural resources, including uranium, iron ore, tin, gypsum, bauxite, copper, salt and natural gas. Australian and Chinese oil companies have been granted licenses for finding petroleum and other natural resources in the country. As a result of these developments, the Somali Petroleum Company was created by the federal government.

In the late 1960s, UN geologists also discovered major uranium deposits and other rare mineral reserves in Somalia. The find was the largest of its kind, with industry experts estimating the deposits at over 25% of the world's then known uranium reserves of 800,000 tons. In 1984, the IUREP Orientation Phase Mission to Somalia reported that the country had 5,000 tons of uranium reasonably assured resources (RAR), 11,000 tons of uranium estimated additional resources (EAR) in calcrete deposits, as well as possibly up to 150,000 tons of uranium speculative resources (SR) in sandstone and calcrete deposits. Somalia concurrently evolved into a major world supplier of uranium, with American, UAE, Italian and Brazilian mineral companies vying for extraction rights. Link Natural resources have a stake in the natural resources of the central region, Kilimanjaro Capital has a stake in the 1,161,400 acres Amsas-Coriole-Afgoi (ACA) Block, which includes uranium exploration. Besides uranium, an unspecified quantity of yttrium, a rare earth element and costly mineral, was also found in the country.

Energy 
In mid-2010, Somalia's business community pledged to invest $1 billion in the national gas and electricity industries over the following five years. Abdullahi Hussein, the director of the just-formed Trans-National Industrial Electricity and Gas Company, predicted that the investment strategy would create 100,000 jobs. The new firm was established through the merger of five Somali companies from the trade, finance, security, and telecommunications sectors. The first phase of the project started within six months of the establishment of the company, and trained youth to supply electricity to economic areas and communities. The second phase began in mid-to-late 2011 and saw the construction of factories in specially designated economic zones for the fishing, agriculture, livestock and mining industries.

In 2012, the Farole administration gave the green light to the first official oil exploration project in Puntland and Somalia at large. Led by the Canadian oil company Africa Oil and its partner Range Resources, initial drilling in the Shabeel-1 well on Puntland's Dharoor Block in March of the year successfully yielded oil.

According to the Central Bank of Somalia, as the nation embarks on the path of reconstruction, the economy is expected to not only match its pre-civil war levels, but also to accelerate in growth and development due to the Somalia's untapped natural resources.

See also
Oil exploration in Puntland
 United Nations Economic Commission for Africa

References

Notes

Bibliography
Mauri, Arnaldo, Banking Development in Somalia, SSRN 958442 (1971).

External links

 
 Somalia latest trade data on ITC Trade Map
 CIA World Factbook: Somalia

 
Somalia
Somalia